Braydon Coburn (born February 27, 1985) is a Canadian former professional ice hockey defenceman. Coburn was originally selected in the first round, eighth overall, by the Atlanta Thrashers in the 2003 NHL Entry Draft, beginning his NHL career with the organization before moving to the Philadelphia Flyers, Tampa Bay Lightning, Ottawa Senators and New York Islanders. Coburn won the Stanley Cup as a member of the Lightning in 2020.

Playing career
Coburn was born in Calgary, Alberta, but grew up in Shaunavon, Saskatchewan, where he played most of his minor hockey. After his Bantam season in 1999–2000, Coburn was selected first overall in the Western Hockey League (WHL) Bantam Draft by the Portland Winter Hawks. The following season, Coburn played Midget AAA hockey for the Notre Dame Hounds of the Saskatchewan Midget Hockey League.

Coburn played major junior hockey with the WHL's Winter Hawks. He was awarded the Jim Piggott Memorial Trophy as rookie of the year for the 2001–02 season, and although his points total dipped from 37 points to 19 the following year, he remained a top NHL prospect, subsequently being selected eighth overall in the 2003 NHL Entry Draft by the Atlanta Thrashers.

After his draft, Coburn returned to the WHL for two more seasons and was eventually awarded with the Doug Wickenheiser Memorial Trophy after the 2003–04 season as Humanitarian of the Year. On February 4, 2005, Coburn tied a WHL record for most goals by a defenceman in a game with four against the Seattle Thunderbirds in a 7–4 win. He completed his final year with the Winter Hawks in 2004–05 with a junior career-high 44 points.

During Coburn's time in the WHL, he also competed in two World Junior Championships for Canada, winning silver in 2004 and gold in 2005. He later played an unfortunate role in the outcome of the 2004 tournament — with the gold medal game between Canada and the United States tied at 3–3 with less than five minutes left to play in regulation, Canadian goaltender Marc-André Fleury tried to clear the puck to avert a breakaway by the USA's Patrick O'Sullivan. However, Fleury's clearing attempt went off Coburn and into his own net, giving the Americans a 4–3 advantage that eventually won them both the game and the gold medal.

Professional
After several years in the Thrashers organization, during which Coburn split his time between the NHL and the Thrashers' minor league affiliate, the Chicago Wolves of the American Hockey League (AHL), Coburn was traded on February 24, 2007 (the NHL trade deadline) to the Philadelphia Flyers in exchange for defenceman Alexei Zhitnik. The trade is often considered one of the more lopsided trades in recent NHL history, as Coburn went on to become one of the Flyers' top defenders while Zhitnik failed to meet expectations and was bought out one year later. The following season, in 2007–08, Coburn emerged with an 8-goal, 36-point season with Philadelphia. In the midst of the Flyers' 2008 Stanley Cup playoff run, Coburn was injured on May 11, 2008, two minutes into Game 2 of the Eastern Conference Final against the Pittsburgh Penguins when a deflected puck hit him above the eye. The resulting gash required 50 stitches to be closed, and Coburn did not return for the rest of the series.

On July 1, 2010, Coburn signed a two-year contract extension with the Flyers. Philadelphia later extended Coburn on November 9, 2011, at a rate of $18 million over four years, a $4.5 million annual cap hit.

Approaching the 2014–15 trade deadline, with the Flyers on the outside of a 2015 playoff position, Coburn was traded to the Tampa Bay Lightning in exchange for defenceman Radko Gudas and a first- and third-round selection in 2015 NHL Entry Draft on March 2, 2015.

On February 26, 2016, Tampa Bay signed Coburn to a three-year, $11.1 million contract extension. On October 15, 2016, Coburn skated in his 700th career NHL game, a 3–2 Lightning win over the visiting New Jersey Devils. On June 18, 2019, Tampa Bay extended Coburn’s contract for an additional 2 years at $3.4 million. Despite a reduced role, appearing in 40 regular season games for 4 points and 3 playoff games, he was a member of the 2019–20 team who won the Stanley Cup.

With a year remaining on his contract, approaching the delayed 2020–21 season and with the Lightning under salary cap constraints, Coburn was traded after six seasons in Tampa Bay along with Cédric Paquette and a 2022 second-round pick to the Ottawa Senators in exchange for Anders Nilsson and the contract of Marián Gáborík on December 27, 2020.

Coburn was traded from the Senators to the New York Islanders on April 11, 2021, for a seventh-round pick in the 2022 NHL Entry Draft. On November 12, 2021, Coburn announced his retirement from the NHL.

Personal life
Coburn married fiancée Nadine in the summer of 2010, and the couple had their first child in October 2011.

Career statistics

Regular season and playoffs

International

Awards and honours

Records
 WHL record for most goals in one game by a defenceman – 4 (on February 4, 2005, against the Seattle Thunderbirds; tied with five other players)

References

External links

 

1985 births
Living people
Athol Murray College of Notre Dame alumni
Atlanta Thrashers draft picks
Atlanta Thrashers players
Canadian ice hockey defencemen
Chicago Wolves players
Ice hockey people from Saskatchewan
National Hockey League first-round draft picks
New York Islanders players
Ottawa Senators players
People from Shaunavon, Saskatchewan
Philadelphia Flyers players
Portland Winterhawks players
Ice hockey people from Calgary
Stanley Cup champions
Tampa Bay Lightning players